Ctenucha cressonana, or Cresson's ctenucha, is a moth of the family Erebidae. The species was first described by Augustus Radcliffe Grote in 1863. It is found in the US Rocky Mountains, including Colorado and New Mexico.

The wingspan is about 45 mm.

The host plant is unknown, but adults have been observed laying eggs on blades of grass.

References

Moths described in 1863
cressonana